Mills Memorial Hospital is a medical facility located in Terrace, British Columbia, with 39 acute care beds. Mills Memorial operates within the North West Regional Hospital District, an area in northern British Columbia designated by provincial law for the purposes of funding and operating hospitals in the area. The North West Regional Hospital District is under the jurisdiction of Northern Health, an administrative body responsible for the delivery of health care services across northern British Columbia. The facility is also supported by a volunteer hospital auxiliary.

Mills Memorial also serves nearby communities such as Kitimat. BC Transit routes include bus service between Kitimat and the hospital.

In 2019, a 356,000 square feet, new hospital project, nearly double the size of the current hospital was announced.

History

There is some debate surrounding the history of the name of Mills Memorial.

Some local residents and historians believe that the hospital was named after Robert Mills, a UBC honours engineering professor, and decorated soldier. Robert Mills helped to build the railway throughout British Columbia, and also built multiple structures throughout north western British Columbia, including work on the hospital. Robert Mills' family still resides in the area, some of whom work as doctors, veterinarians, lawyers, and teachers in north west British Columbia. The Mills name has a rich history in the area.
       
Other community members believe that the hospital was named after Dr. Stanley Gordon Mills
b- Aug 13, 1885 at 50 Garry St. in Winnipeg, Manitoba
d- May 21, 1961, DOA Terrace District Hospital*, Terrace, British Columbia, age 75
Died from a fire in his residence where he was sleeping.
 
Buried in Kitsumgallum Cemetery, Terrace, British Columbia.
later became Mills Memorial Hospital in his honour.
father- George Gordon Mills, b- Simcoe Co., Ontario, Canada (1850-1932)
Barrister, founder of the firm Mills & Mills.
mother- Kitty Carolina Jones, b- Gawler, South Australia (1860-1938)

He was age 43 living in Rock Bay, British Columbia, when he married
Edith Jean Parker September 8, 1928, 
in St. Mary's Church, Kerrisdale, Vancouver, British Columbia
b- Apr 14, 1905, Regina SK (Minnatonas, Manitoba in Wedding cert?)
d- May 21, 1961 Lazelle Ave, Terrace, British Columbia, age 56
buried in Kitsumgallum Cemetery, Terrace, British Columbia.
Died from a fire in her residence where she was sleeping.
She was age 24, a registered nurse, living in Chilliwack, British Columbia, when she married. 
father- Herbert Parker, b- Woodstock, Ontario (Winnipeg, Manitoba?)
mother- Jennie Jess, b- Quebec (Minatonis, Manitoba?)

son- Stanley "Parker" Gordon Mills
elected on Terrace's First Council c. 1960

Dr. Mills Bio

Served in World War I, enlisting in Toronto, Ontario, Apr 20, 1915
attained rank of captain.

Dr. Mills came to Terrace on May 7, 1930 to take over a one-bed hospital from Dr. Brummitt.

Dr. Mills retired as a medical doctor in 1957

Amenities
 Emergency services
 Laboratory and radiology (x-ray) services
 Obstetrical care
 Outpatient ambulatory-care procedures
 Renal services and hemodialysis unit
 Mammography screening program
 A 10-bed psychiatric unit

References

Hospitals in British Columbia
Terrace, British Columbia